Louis Jefferson Brann (July 6, 1876 – February 3, 1948) was an American lawyer and political figure.  He was the 56th Governor of Maine.

Early life 
Brann was born in Madison, Maine to Charles M. Brann and Nancy Lancaster Brann.  He attended schools in Gardiner, Maine.  He graduated from the University of Maine in 1898, after which he studied law.  He was admitted to the bar in 1902 and began a practice in Lewiston.  In the late 1920s he formed Brann & Isaacson with Peter A. Isaacson, a law firm which is still in existence (2010).

On March 8, 1902, Brann married Martha "Mattie" Cobb.  They were the parents of four children—Donald L., Marjorie, Dorothy L., and Nancy E.

Brann participated widely in local and state government: he was the Androscoggin County Register of Probate (1909-1913); a municipal judge (1913-1915); mayor of Lewiston (1915-1917 and  1922–1925); member of the Maine House of Representatives (1919-1920); and delegate to the Democratic National Convention from Maine (1924, 1936, 1940 and 1944).  He also served a term as chairman of the Maine Democratic Party.

Governor of Maine
Brann ran successfully for Governor of Maine in 1932, and was also successful in his re-election bid in 1934.  During his administration, a constitutional amendment was sanctioned that secured two million dollars in state bonds for emergency relief during the Great Depression.  As part of an initiative to promote Maine tourism and economic development, Brann entertained many celebrities at Blaine House; the "Maine Summer Visitors Day" program he started brought notables to Maine including Boston Braves President Emil Fuchs, authors Gladys Hasty Carroll, Kenneth Roberts and Ben Ames Williams, and singer Rudy Vallee.

Later years 
Brann ran unsuccessfully for the United States Senate in 1936.  He also ran unsuccessfully for governor in 1938.  Brann ran unsuccessfully for the other Maine Senate seat in 1940.  In 1942, he was also an unsuccessful candidate for Maine's 1st District seat in the United States House of Representatives.

Brann was a member of the Church of Christ, Scientist, and held membership in Beta Theta Pi, and the Knights of Pythias,  Elks, National Grange, and Lions Club.

Brann died in Lewiston on February 3, 1948.  He was buried at Riverside Cemetery in Lewiston.

References

Sources

Books

Internet

External sources
Sobel, Robert and John Raimo. Biographical Directory of the Governors of the United States, 1789-1978. Greenwood Press, 1988. 

|-

American Christian Scientists
Governors of Maine
Mayors of Lewiston, Maine
Maine Democratic Party chairs
University of Maine alumni
People from Madison, Maine
People from Gardiner, Maine
1876 births
1948 deaths
Democratic Party governors of Maine